Wang Liting may refer to:

Anthea Ong, Singaporean businesswoman and politician
Olivia Ong, Singaporean singer and actress